EPHA may refer to:
 European Public Health Alliance, a European non-profit association registered in Belgium
 Ephrin receptors (EPHA1-10), components of cell signalling pathways involved in animal growth and development